Below is the list of asteroid close approaches to Earth in 2017.

Timeline of known close approaches less than one lunar distance from Earth in 2017 
A list of known near-Earth asteroid close approaches less than 1 lunar distance from Earth in 2017.

In 2017, five known asteroids have traveled nearer than this, 2017 GM, 2017 UJ2, YU95BEF, 2017 EA, and 2017 WE30. P10ELNY and A104Vqx probably have traveled nearer, but knowledge of their orbits is too poor to be sure.

While most asteroids on this list are confirmed, well-observed unconfirmed objects with a 50% or greater chance of passing within 1 LD of the Earth are included as well.

This list does not include any of the 29 objects that collided with earth in 2017, none of which were discovered in advance, but were recorded by sensors designed to detect detonation of nuclear devices (of the 29 objects detected, 6 had an impact energy greater than that of a 1 kiloton device).

Warning times by size 
This sub-section visualises the warning times of the close approaches listed in the above table, depending on the size of the asteroid. The sizes of the charts show the relative sizes of the asteroids to scale. For comparison, the approximate size of a person is also shown. This is based the absolute magnitude of each asteroid, an approximate measure of size based on brightness.

Abs Magnitude 30 and greater
 (size of a person for comparison)

Abs Magnitude 29-30

Absolute Magnitude 28-29

Absolute Magnitude 27-28

Absolute Magnitude 26-27

Absolute Magnitude 25-26
 
Absolute Magnitude less than 25 (largest)

Notes

Timeline of close approaches less than one lunar distance from the Moon in 2017 
The number of asteroids listed here are significantly less than those of asteroids that approach Earth for several reasons. Asteroids that approach Earth not only move faster, but are brighter and are easier to detect with modern surveys because:
 Asteroids that come closer to Earth are a higher priority to confirm, and only confirmed asteroids are listed with a lunocentric approach distance.
 Those that closely approach the Moon are frequently lost in its glare, making them harder to confirm. They are similarly hard to discover during the new moon, when the Moon is too close to the Sun to detect asteroids while they are near the Moon.

These factors severely limit the amount of Moon-approaching asteroids, to a level many times lower than the asteroids detected passing as close to Earth.

Notes

Additional examples

An example list of near-Earth asteroids that passed or will pass more than 1 lunar distance (384,400 km or 0.00256 AU) from Earth in 2017.

Statistics

Virtual impactors

List of asteroids with a Palermo Technical Impact Hazard Scale greater than −6 that are listed on the Sentry Risk Table because they have short observation arcs with poorly constrained orbits and have a chance of impacting Earth in 2017. Given a short observation arc, many different orbits fit the observed data.  could have approached Earth around May 2017 or could have been 9 AU from Earth on the way to a close approach with Saturn in 2018. A Palermo rating of −4 indicates an event that is 10,000 times less likely than the background hazard level of Earth impacts, which is defined as the average risk posed by objects of the same size or larger over the years until the date of the potential impact.

Notes

See also 
List of asteroid close approaches to Earth
List of asteroid close approaches to Earth in 2016
List of asteroid close approaches to Earth in 2018
List of bolides (asteroids and meteoroids that impacted Earth)

References

External links 
Near-Earth object close approaches ±30 days within 5 LD (JPL)
Upcoming close approaches to Earth (ESA)
Table of Asteroids Next Closest Approaches to the Earth (Sormano Observatory)

close approaches to Earth in 2017
Near-Earth asteroids